Malgadh is a village in Deesa of Banaskantha district in Gujarat, India.

Villages in Banaskantha district